The Edward Edinger House is a historic building located in the West End of Davenport, Iowa, United States. It has been listed on the National Register of Historic Places since 1984.

History
This late Victorian home was designed by Edward Hammatt who had designed several buildings for the Episcopal Diocese of Iowa. In Davenport these buildings include a classroom-dormitory building at St. Katherine's Hall, Sheldon Hall, and Kemper Hall, which is still on the property of Davenport Central High School in the College Square Historic District. Edward Edinger, who had this house built, was a stonemason.

Architecture
The Edinger House is a 2½-story structure that follows an irregular plan in a generalized medieval style. It features a corner tower with a conical roof in one the angles in the front of the house. The dominant feature of this structure is its masonry. The walls are composed of ashlar brownstone, laid in a random pattern. A lighter colored stone was used for the belt coursing. The second floor is framed with rubble stone, and it is also found on the gable ends. Edinger's stone business may have contributed to the idiosyncratic nature of the house's design.

References

Houses completed in 1890
Victorian architecture in Iowa
Houses on the National Register of Historic Places in Iowa
Houses in Davenport, Iowa
National Register of Historic Places in Davenport, Iowa